Galidacris is a genus of grasshoppers belonging to the family Acrididae. They are found in South America within Colombia and Ecuador.

Behavior 
The males of the genus have been recorded approaching a female, moving their hind legs (knee-waving) and antennae (twitch-back) silently. The reasoning behind this requires further study. This behavior is a mark of convergent evolution as members in more distantly related grasshoppers share this behavior, while other closer genera do not.

Species 

 Galidacris agilis (Descamps & Amédégnato, 1972)
 Galidacris cordillerae (Descamps & Amédégnato, 1972)
 Galidacris eckardtae (Günther, 1940)
 Galidacris variabilis (Descamps & Amédégnato, 1972)

References 

Acrididae
Acrididae genera